Ángel Aristedes Chávez (born July 22, 1981) is a Panamanian professional baseball infielder. He has compiled a .269 career average with 74 home runs, 478 RBI and 98 stolen bases (in 137 attempts), in 936 minor league contests. He originally signed with the San Francisco Giants as a non-drafted free agent on October 30, 1998. He was born in David, Chiriquí, Panama.

Career

San Francisco Giants
Chávez enjoyed a year at the minor league level, before having his contract purchased by the Giants on August 30. He made a big league debut that night vs. the Colorado Rockies, starting at shortstop for ailing Omar Vizquel. He played in 10 games (4 starts - 3 at shortstop, 1 at second base) with the Giants, going 5-for-19 (.263) with a 2B. Despite missing the final 2 weeks of the minor league season, he ranked 5th among all Giants farmhands with a career-high 83 RBIs in a combined 119 games. He batted .282 with 19 2Bs, 4 3Bs and a career-high 16 HRs.

New York Yankees
Chávez was invited to spring training by the New York Yankees on January 12, 2007, but did not make the team and was not called up to the majors during the season. Chávez played 114 games for the Yankees Triple-A team, the Scranton/Wilkes-Barre Yankees, batting .291 and driving in 66 runs.

Los Angeles Dodgers
On December 12, 2007, Chávez signed a minor league contract with an invitation to spring training with the Los Angeles Dodgers. On March 31, 2008, his contract was purchased by the Dodgers. He began the season on the Dodgers opening day roster, but did not play in a game with them before he was designated for assignment. Chávez cleared waivers and was assigned to play for the Dodgers Triple-A team, the Las Vegas 51s. He became a free agent at the end of the season.

Boston Red Sox

In January 2009, Chávez signed a minor league contract with the Boston Red Sox.

Tampa Bay Rays
In February 2010, Chávez signed a minor league contract with the Tampa Bay Rays.

Bridgeport Bluefish
In April 2011, Chávez signed an independent league contract with the Bridgeport Bluefish.

Bocas Del Toro
In February 2012, Chávez signed with Panama semi-professional league team Bocas  and the team went on to win the National Championship.

Vaqueros Laguna
In May 2012, after finishing in Panama, Chávez signed a contract with the Vaqueros in Torreón, Mexico.

Chiriquí
In 2013, Chávez played for his native province of Chiriquí in the Panama semi-professional league, winning the National Championship for a second straight year.

Sioux Falls Canaries
Chávez signed with the Sioux Falls Canaries of the American Association of Independent Professional Baseball and played for them during the 2015 season.

External links

1981 births
Living people
Acereros de Monclova players
Arizona League Giants players
Baseball players at the 2011 Pan American Games
Bowie Baysox players
Bridgeport Bluefish players
Durham Bulls players
Fresno Grizzlies players
Hagerstown Suns players
Las Vegas 51s players
Major League Baseball players from Panama
Major League Baseball second basemen
Major League Baseball shortstops
Major League Baseball third basemen
Mexican League baseball first basemen
Mexican League baseball second basemen
Mexican League baseball third basemen
Norwich Navigators players
Pan American Games competitors for Panama
Panamanian expatriate baseball players in Mexico
Panamanian expatriate baseball players in the United States
Pawtucket Red Sox players
People from David District
Reading Phillies players
San Francisco Giants players
San Jose Giants players
Scranton/Wilkes-Barre Red Barons players
Scranton/Wilkes-Barre Yankees players
Southern Maryland Blue Crabs players
Vaqueros Laguna players
2009 World Baseball Classic players